Santa Monica Mall may mean;
Third Street Promenade, a downtown pedestrian mall, in Santa Monica, California, built in 1965, whose original name was Santa Monica Mall
Santa Monica Place, an outdoor shopping mall in Santa Monica, California, adjacent to Third Street Promenade